The provinces of Peru are the second-level administrative subdivisions of the country. They are divided into districts. There are 196 provinces in Peru, grouped into 25 regions, except for Lima Province which does not belong to any region. This makes an average of seven provinces per region. The region with the fewest provinces is Callao (one) and the region with the most is Ancash (twenty).

While provinces in the sparsely populated Amazon rain forest of eastern Peru tend to be larger, there is a large concentration of them in the north-central area of the country. The province with the fewest districts is Purús Province, with just one district. The province with the most districts is Lima Province, with 43 districts. The most common number of districts per province is eight; a total of 29 provinces share this number of districts.

Provinces table
The table below shows all provinces with their capitals and the region in which they are located. The UBIGEO code uniquely identifies each province. Capitals in bold are also a regional capital. Provinces in which the region's capital is located all have an UBIGEO code ending in 01.

By population

See also
 Administrative divisions of Peru
 Regions of Peru
 Districts of Peru
 Municipalities of Peru

 
Subdivisions of Peru
Peru, Provinces
Provinces, Peru
Peru geography-related lists